Emily Benham  (born 1989) is a British mountain bike orienteering athlete. She is considered the world's best female MTBO athlete. Benham has won four individual World Championship gold medals, two in 2016 and two in 2017, has won the World Cup overall for four consecutive years, and is the European Champion. She holds more World Cup wins than any other MTBO athlete, male or female.

Career 
Started Mountain Bike Orienteering (MTBO) in 2007 after having orienteered since the age of 11. She has a degree in Physiotherapy from Sheffield Hallam University and is currently living in Sweden.

Competitive career highlights to date include four top 6 results from Junior World Championships in 2008/2009 and four World MTB Orienteering Championships gold medals (2016 sprint and long, 2017 mass start and long). She became the first person to defend a long distance world title since 2010. Benham holds four World Championship titles, 5 silver medals and 3 bronze medals, making her the most successful MTBO athlete in recent years. In 2017 she medalled in every World Championship race she started.

References

Sources 
 Interview

External links 
 Emily Benham's Blog
 Emily Benham's current IOF ranking status
 

1989 births
Living people
British female cyclists
British orienteers
Female orienteers
Mountain bike orienteers
Place of birth missing (living people)